Patrick Jensen (born 27 February 1996) is a B2 classified visually impaired Para-alpine skier from Australia. He represented Australia at the 2018 Winter Paralympics and  the 2022 Winter Paralympics.

Personal
At the age of seven, Jensen was diagnosed with macular dystrophy and Stargardt disease  at the age of seven. Jensen has 70 per cent sight in his left eye, but his right is 70 per cent blind.  He is the drummer of Newcastle, New South Wales based skramz band George Booth.  In 2018, he was studying massage therapy at Evolve College and  considering a career in physiotherapy after 2018 Winter Paralympics.

Skiing
In 2013, Jensen attended a Disabled Wintersport Australia camp.  In 2013, he debuted for Australia at the IPC Alpine Skiing World Cup in Thredbo, New South Wales. With his guide Lara Falk, they finished third in the Men's Giant Slalom B2 and Super-G B2 at the  2017 IPC Alpine Skiing Europa Cup in Veysonnaz, Switzerland. At the 2017 World Para-alpine Skiing Championships in Tarvisio, Italy, they finished ninth in the Men's Slalom B2.

At the 2018 Winter Paralympics, he competed in two events - 11th in the Men's Giant Slalom Visually Impaired and did not finish in the Men's Slalom Visually Impaired.

At the 2019 World Para Alpine Skiing Championships in Kranjska Gora, Slovenia, he finished seventh in both the Men's Downhill and Slalom Visually Impaired and ninth in the Men's Giant Slalom Visually Impaired.

At the 2022 Winter Paralympics with his guide Amelia Hodgson , he competed in five events - 6th in Super G and 8th in the Downhill and Slalom Visually Impaired events. He failed to finish in the Giant Slalom and Super G Combined.

References

External links
 Paralympics Australia Profile
 International Paralympic Committee Profile

Living people
Alpine skiers at the 2018 Winter Paralympics
Alpine skiers at the 2022 Winter Paralympics
Paralympic alpine skiers of Australia
Visually impaired category Paralympic competitors
1996 births
Australian male alpine skiers
Australian blind people
20th-century Australian people
21st-century Australian people